Basiliscus was the Eastern Roman (Byzantine) Emperor from 475 to 476.

Basiliscus may also refer to:
 Basiliscus (Caesar), Caesar of the East Roman Empire in 476–477/8 and later bishop of Cyzicus
 Basiliscus of Comana (died c. 310), Greek martyr.
 Basiliscus (lizard), a genus of large corytophanid lizards, commonly known as basilisks
Crotalus basiliscus, a species of snake

See also
Basilisk (disambiguation)